Lichterfelde West is part of Lichterfelde in the Steglitz-Zehlendorf borough of Berlin. It is known for its historic mansions, tree-lined streets and green squares.

Next to Dahlem and Grunewald, Lichterfelde West is one of the German capital's wealthiest and most sought-after residential areas. Since the German government's move to Berlin in 2000, it has seen the highest rises in real-estate prices of any area in former West-Berlin. Today, many mansions in Lichterfelde West are used by diplomats for representative purposes.

Lichterfelde West is home to the Berlin Botanical Garden and Museum, the Schlosspark Lichterfelde manor and park, as well as the Charité university hospital's Benjamin Franklin Campus.  The former Prussian Main Cadet School is home to the German Federal Archives, while the German Federal Intelligence Service (BND) operates from a historic building in Lichterfelde West. A new "Business and Innovation Center" of nearby Free University of Berlin is being developed close to the Botanical Garden.

Mansions of Lichterfelde West (Villenkolonie Lichterfelde) 
Lichterfelde West is best known for the 19th-century Villenkolonie Lichterfelde, which was developed from 1860 to 1900 by the wealthy businessman Johann von Carstenn and is a remarkable example of 19th-century Villenkolonie, a German concept of settlements completely made up of mansion houses or villas. While some houses were destroyed in World War II, Lichterfelde West has kept its 19th-century charm and boasts a large assortment of villas in an often extravagant mix of architectural styles. The architect Gustav Lilienthal built a number of Tudor-Revival style homes in Lichterfelde West, also known as "Carstenn-Castles".

It still features its original tree-lined and cobbled streets, small squares and working gas lights. The Prussian Main Cadet School, which contributed to Lichterfelde West's reputation of being home to many German aristocrats, was disbanded in 1920 by the Treaty of Versailles.

Swiss Quarter 
Development continued after completion of the mansion colony and more residential buildings were built until the 1930s. At the time, many streets were named after Swiss places and personalities, thus leading to this area of Lichterfelde West to getting referred to as "Schweizer Viertel" (en.: Swiss Quarter). After the fall of the Berlin wall, areas formerly occupied by U.S. Armed Forces were developed into townhouses or converted into loft-style apartments. In 2008, the private, bilingual (English and German) Phorms School opened in the Swiss Quarter of Lichterfelde West.

Transportation
Lichterfelde West is connected to the Berlin S-Bahn commuter rail network by its station on the S1 line. The rail station also serves nearby Free University in bordering Dahlem. From S Lichterfelde West, it takes around 15 minutes to both Berlin-Mitte and Wannsee. Additionally, various bus lines offer public transportation service to Steglitz, Zehlendorf, Dahlem, and Lichterfelde Ost.

Walks
For a twenty-minute stroll leave Lichterfelde West train station direction South, cross Curtiusstrasse into Baselerstrasse. Follow until you reach Karlsplatz, turn left along the square, cross Ringstrasse into Kadettenweg. Follow Kadettenweg, and pass by the Cadet Corps memorial at Paulinenplatz until you reach Weddigenweg. Turn right, after two hundred yards turn right again into Paulinenstrasse for a short stop at the so-called "Carstenn Castles", small villas built in Tudor-castle style. Turn back and turn right again into Weddigenweg, across Baseler Strasse, until you reach Kommandanten Strasse. Turn right, follow Kommandanten Strasse (dir. North), cross Ringstrasse, still follow Kommandantenstrasse, pass by the "Rother Stift", a former retirement home for dowagers, until you reach Kadettenweg (North end). Follow Kadettenweg for a few hundred yards, turn right into Curtiustrasse, pass by the "Litehouse" restaurant and back to the train station.

Places of interest
 Berlin Botanical Garden and Museum
 Lichterfelde Manor with park
 Parkfriedhof Lichterfelde (cemetery known for many notable having been buried here)
 German Federal Archives (located in former Prussian Main Cadet School)
 German Federal Intelligence Service (BND)
 Charité university hospital's Benjamin Franklin Campus
 German Federal Institute for Materials Research and Testing (BAM)

Notable residents 

 Hasso von Boehmer, lieutenant colonel and one of the 20 July Plotters
 Herbert von Bose, head of the press division of the Vice Chancellery under Franz von Papen and opponent of the Nazi regime
 Johann Albrecht von Bülow, General of the Infantry under Fredrick the Great 
 Bushido, German rapper and producer
 Fritz Elsas, former mayor of Berlin and opponent of Nazi regime
 Peter Fox, German singer and songwriter
 Otto Hahn, OBE, German chemist and pioneer in the fields of radioactivity and radiochemistry
 Theodor Heuss, former president of West Germany
 Günther Jauch, German television host and producer
 Nils Seethaler, cultural anthropologist
 Adolf Wehrmut, former mayor of Berlin
 Arthur Werner, former mayor of Berlin
 Josef Wirmer, German jurist and opponent of the Nazi regime
 Peter Yorck, count of Wartenburg, German jurist and opponent of the Nazi regime

References

External links

Zones of Berlin
Steglitz-Zehlendorf

es:Lichterfelde
fr:Lichterfelde